The Bismarck masked flying fox (Pteropus capistratus) is a species of flying fox in the family Pteropodidae found in Papua New Guinea and named after the Bismarck Archipelago. It was once considered a subspecies of Pteropus temminckii before being reassessed in 2001. This species has two subspecies, P. c. capistratus and P. c. ennisae.  The IUCN classified it as Near Threatened in 2009, noting that the rate of decline is almost high enough to reclassify the species as Vulnerable.

Taxonomy
The Bismarck masked flying fox was described as a new species in 1867 by German naturalist Wilhelm Peters. Prior to 1995, the Bismarck masked flying fox was largely considered a subspecies of the Temminck's flying fox (Pteropus temminckii).

Description

Biology and ecology
It is one of the rare species of mammals in which the males can lactate.
It is generally solitary, though males and females may roost together in pairs.

Range and habitat

Conservation
As of 2010, it is evaluated as a near-threatened species by the IUCN. It meets the criteria for this designation because of widespread habitat destruction across its range. It is likely experiencing "significant" population decline, though not higher than 30% over ten years, which would qualify it as a vulnerable species.

References

Pteropus
Mammals described in 1867
Taxa named by Wilhelm Peters
Bats of Oceania